N'Golobougou is a small town and commune in the Cercle of Dioila in the Koulikoro Region of southern Mali. As of 1998 the commune had a population of 14,880.

References

External links
N'Golobougou at csa-mali.org

Communes of Koulikoro Region